Clapstick may refer to:
Clapperboard, a white and black striped board used in movie making
Clapsticks, an ancestral Australian instrument consisting of a wooden pair of sticks
Clapper stick, an ancestral Californian instrument

See also
Clapper (musical instrument)